Zeiraphera is a genus of moths belonging to the subfamily Olethreutinae of the family Tortricidae.

Species
Zeiraphera argutana (Christoph, 1881)
Zeiraphera atra Falkovitsh, 1965
Zeiraphera bicolora Kawabe, 1976
Zeiraphera caeruleumana Kawabe, 1980
Zeiraphera canadensis Mutuura & Freeman, 1967
Zeiraphera claypoleana (Riley, 1882)
Zeiraphera corpulentana (Kennel, 1901)
Zeiraphera demutata (Walsingham, 1900)
Zeiraphera fortunana (Kearfott, 1907)
Zeiraphera fulvomixtana Kawabe, 1974
Zeiraphera funesta (Filipjev, 1931)
Zeiraphera gansuensis Liu & Bae, 1994
Zeiraphera griseana (Hübner, [1796-1799])
Zeiraphera hesperiana Mutuura & Freeman, 1967
Zeiraphera hiroshii Kawabe, 1980
Zeiraphera hohuanshana Kawabe, 1986
Zeiraphera improbana (Walker, 1863)
Zeiraphera isertana (Fabricius, 1794)
Zeiraphera lariciana Kawabe, 1980
Zeiraphera luciferana Kawabe, 1980
Zeiraphera nigra Kawabe, 1995
Zeiraphera pacifica Freeman, 1966
Zeiraphera ratzeburgiana (Saxesen, in Ratzeburg, 1840)
Zeiraphera rufimitrana (Herrich-Schffer, 1851)
Zeiraphera shimekii Kawabe, 1974
Zeiraphera smaragdina Razowski, 1963
Zeiraphera subcorticana (Snellen, 1883)
Zeiraphera suzukii Oku, 1968
Zeiraphera taiwana Kawabe, 1986
Zeiraphera thymelopa (Meyrick in Caradja & Meyrick, 1938)
Zeiraphera unfortunana Powell, 1983
Zeiraphera vancouverana McDunnough, 1925
Zeiraphera virinea Falkovitsh, 1965

See also
List of Tortricidae genera

References

External links
Tortricid.net

Eucosmini
Tortricidae genera